Zahia Dahmani (born 2 June 1972, in Roubaix) is a former French athlete, who specialized in long-distance running.

Dahmani won the French national title for the half marathon in 2001, the 5000 metres in 1997, the 10,000 metres in 1997 and 1999, and 10K run in 1997 and 2000.

In 1996, during the IAAF World Half Marathon Championships in Palma, Spain, she won the silver medal in the team event alongside her compatriots Christine Mallo and Muriel Linsolas.

At the European Cross Country Championships, she received the team silver medal in 1999 and the bronze team medal in 1996.

International competitions

Personal bests

References
 
  Fédération française d'athlétisme profile

1972 births
Living people
Sportspeople from Roubaix
French female long-distance runners
French female marathon runners